The Lineville Subdivision is a railroad line owned by CSX Transportation in the U.S. states of Alabama and Georgia. At its west end it continues east from the S&NA South Subdivision and at its east end it continues east as the Manchester Subdivision.

See also
 List of CSX Transportation lines
 Atlanta, Birmingham and Atlantic Railroad

References

CSX Transportation lines